Scopula minorata is a moth of the family Geometridae. It was described by Jean Baptiste Boisduval in 1833. It is found in Africa south of the Sahara, the Arabian Peninsula and on the islands of the Indian Ocean. Furthermore, it is found in southern Europe. It can be distinguished from Scopula lactaria only by examination of its genitalia.

Subspecies
Scopula minorata minorata
Scopula minorata corcularia (Rebel, 1894)
Scopula minorata ochroleucaria (Herrich-Schäffer, 1847)
Scopula minorata tripolitana (Sterneck, 1933)

References

minorata
Moths described in 1833
Moths of Europe
Moths of Cape Verde
Moths of the Comoros
Moths of Africa
Moths of Madagascar
Moths of Mauritius
Moths of Réunion
Moths of Seychelles
Moths of Asia
Taxa named by Jean Baptiste Boisduval